Rana criolla literally means "Creole frog". It is a common name of some Leptodactylus frogs in Spanish-speaking countries, namely:

 Leptodactylus chaquensis
 Leptodactylus ocellatus

Animal common name disambiguation pages